Anarsia anthracaula is a moth in the  family Gelechiidae. It was described by Edward Meyrick in 1929. It is found on the New Hebrides.

References

anthracaula
Moths described in 1929
Moths of Oceania